Peter Pyungchoo Ahn (May 21, 1917 – August 13, 2003) was a Korean-born missionary of the United Methodist Church. He served as pastor of San Francisco Korean United Methodist Church from 1953 until 1960. Ahn earned his Ph.D. (1962) from Boston University, and was one of the original translators of the New American Standard Bible.

References

1917 births
2003 deaths
Boston University School of Theology alumni
Translators of the Bible into English
Korean Methodist missionaries
20th-century translators
Korean emigrants to the United States
20th-century Methodists
Missionary linguists